Babette Rose Bolivar (born 1962) is a retired United States Navy rear admiral who last served as the commander of Navy Region Southwest (nicknamed "The Navy Mayor of San Diego") from March 14, 2019 to July 16, 2021. She was the second woman and first Filipino-American to command the navy region, which covers California, Nevada, Utah, Arizona, Colorado, and New Mexico.

She was promoted to her latest rank on March 1, 2014.

She retired from active duty in 2021 after relinquishing command of Navy Region Southwest to Stephen D. Barnett.

Early life and education

A native of Hawaii, Bolivar was raised by traditional Filipino-American parents, retired U.S. Navy sailor Ted Sereno Bolivar from Nabua, Camarines Sur, and Virginia Dolor Bolivar from Pangasinan. She received her commission from the United States Naval Academy where she received a B.S. degree in Oceanography in 1985. She also has an M.S. degree in management from Troy University.

Controversies

In 2017, Bolivar was officially reprimanded by then-commander of the United States Indo-Pacific Command, Admiral Philip S. Davidson for three of five substantiated allegations against her in relation to the Fat Leonard scandal which took place during her command of the USS Salvor in 1998. Davidson's letter of reprimand determined that Bolivar had wrongly accepted gifts in the form of "a free hotel room, dinner, drinks, entertainment and a golf excursion" from Leonard Glenn Francis, owner of Glenn Defense Marine Asia. However, it was also argued that she had never willingly accepted the gifts or was aware of Fat Leonard's criminal activities in any way, and Davidson instead considered the matter closed. No further action was taken against her.

In 2019, Chief of Naval Operations John M. Richardson unexpectedly stripped Bolivar of her authority to preside over two SEAL-related court-martial cases, namely those of Jacob X. Portier and Eddie Gallagher. This was in response to a letter by Bolivar to Gallagher's civilian defense attorney, Timothy Parlatore, requesting that a harsher punishment be meted out to the Navy SEAL, suggesting that factors such as witness intimidation, interference with the administration of justice, the effect of deferment on the good order and discipline on the command and Gallagher’s character could be considered, and that Parlatore’s plea “fails to satisfy” those concerns". In essence, this was a show of support for a harsher punishment for Gallagher in opposition to what was supported by the military jury of his peers.

References

Living people
1962 births
People from Hawaii
Military personnel from Hawaii
American military personnel of Filipino descent
Female admirals of the United States Navy
United States Naval Academy alumni
Troy University alumni
Recipients of the Defense Superior Service Medal
Recipients of the Legion of Merit
United States Navy rear admirals (lower half)
21st-century American women